Huyck is a surname. Notable people with this surname include:

 Kevin Huyck, American Air Force general
 Thomas Huyck (died 1575), English prelate
 Willard Huyck (born 1945), American screenwriter and director
 Willard M. Huyck (1917–2018), American politician and soldier

See also
 Huck (surname)